Usman Wala , is a town in Kasur District in the Punjab province of Pakistan. 

It is administratively part of Kasur Tehsil, and is at an altitude of 197 metres (649 feet). 

Rail transport is centred on Usmanwala railway station.

References

Populated places in Kasur District

And media person chairman press club Mandi Usman Wala Malil Muhammad Hussain general secretory Imran Mahmood .